ACT Sport Hall of Fame was established by ACTSPORT in 1995. It was taken over by the Australian Capital Territory Government after ACTSPORT ceased operations in 2015. Inductees are announced as part of the annual CBR Sport Awards. ACT Sport Hall of Fame is physically located at the University of Canberra's Sporting Commons.

There are two types of membership into the ActewAGL ACT Sport Hall of Fame:
Full Members – Athletes only, who have been retired for at least 3 years.
Associate Members – Administrators, officials, referees and other support staff.

Full Members

Associate Members
Associate members are administrators, coaches and umpires/referees.

References

External links
ACT Sport Hall of Fame

Australian sports trophies and awards
Halls of fame in Australia
All-sports halls of fame
Sport in the Australian Capital Territory
Awards established in 1995